South Asian Veggie Table is a cooking show first produced in 1998 for the Omni Television, an Ontario television network in Canada. It is a half-hour TV show of Indian and South Asian vegetarian cooking hosted by Karen Johnson and Ronica Sajnani. The show has been syndicated internationally.

Johnson and Sajnani started a new cooking show called South Asian Tasting Table which is not a vegetarian show.

List of episodes

Each episode teaches two recipes.

See also 
 List of Canadian television series

References

External links
South Asian Veggie Table on Omni - Recipes from the original show 
South Asian Tasting Table - Official website of Karen and Ronica's new show (not vegetarian)

Vegetarian cuisine
Vegetarian-related mass media
1990s Canadian cooking television series
Omni Television original programming
South Asian Canadian culture